Yanjing Beer 2017 Chinese FA Cup was the 19th edition of the Chinese FA Cup. The winner Shanghai Greenland Shenhua qualified for the group stage of the 2018 AFC Champions League.

Schedule

Source:

Home Advantage Decision
According to Chinese FA Cup Procedure, in each round, home team advantages are decided as follows.

Qualifying rounds

Preliminary round

Notes

Qualifying round

Group A

Group B

Group C

Group D

First round

Notes

Second round

Notes

Third round

Fourth round

Fifth round

1st Leg

2nd Leg

Shanghai Shenxin won 4–3 on aggregate.

Guangzhou Evergrande Taobao won 9–6 on aggregate.

Shanghai Greenland Shenhua won 3–1 on aggregate.

Shanghai SIPG won 4–3 on aggregate.

Semi-finals

1st Leg

2nd Leg

Shanghai Greenland Shenhua won 2–0 on aggregate.

Shanghai SIPG won 6–2 on aggregate.

Final

1st Leg

Assistant referees:
Ye Zhi (Shenzhen FA)
Lou Fangping (Chongqing FA)
Fourth official:
Li Haixin (Guangdong FA)

2nd Leg

Assistant referees:
Song Xiangyun (Dalian FA)
Cao Yi (Henan FA)
Fourth official:
Ai Kun (Beijing Sport University)

3–3 on aggregate. Shanghai Greenland Shenhua won on away goals.

Awards
 Top Scorer:  Obafemi Martins (Shanghai Greenland Shenhua) (6 goals)
 Most Valuable Player:  Cao Yunding (Shanghai Greenland Shenhua)
 Fair Play Award: Shanghai Shenxin
 Dark Horse Award: Shanghai Shenxin

Most Valuable Player of The Round

Top scorers
Source:

External links
 Regulations of 2017 Chinese FA Cup

References

2017
2017 in Chinese football
2017 domestic association football cups